Ruksin is a Sub-Division and Major City located in the East Siang district, Arunachal Pradesh.

Location
Ruksin is located 30 km away from its district headquarters of Pasighat. It is the entrance to the East Siang district from the Assam.

Transport
The proposed  Mago-Thingbu to Vijaynagar Arunachal Pradesh Frontier Highway along the McMahon Line, will intersect with the proposed East-West Industrial Corridor Highway and will pass through this district.

See also

 North-East Frontier Agency
 List of people from Arunachal Pradesh
 Religion in Arunachal Pradesh
 Cuisine of Arunachal Pradesh
 List of institutions of higher education in Arunachal Pradesh

References 

Cities and towns in East Siang district